Mark Lomunokol is a Kenyan politician who is currently a member of the National Assembly for Kacheliba Constituency. He is a member of the United Democratic Alliance .

He studied at Mount Kenya University, and prior to entering into parliament in the 2013 Kenyan general election, he worked for the World Food Programme and the Kenya Red Cross Society.

From 2013 to 2017 he was a member of the Committee on Regional Integration and the Departmental Committee on Transport, Public Works & Housing. Since 2017 he has been a member of the Special Funds Account Committee.

Election Results

References

 Kenyan politicians
Year of birth missing (living people)
Living people
Place of birth missing (living people)
Mount Kenya University alumni